Brooks Frederick Landgraf (born March 15, 1981) is an American attorney and politician serving as a member of the Texas House of Representatives from the 81st district. Elected in November 2014, he assumed office in 2015.

Early life and education 
Landgraf is a native of Odessa, Texas and graduated from Permian High School. He earned a Bachelor of Science degree from Texas A&M University and a Juris Doctor from the St. Mary's University School of Law. As an undergraduate, Landgraf was a member of the Texas A&M University Corps of Cadets.

Career 
After graduating from law school, Landgraf returned to Odessa and began working as an attorney. Landgraf was elected to the Texas House of Representatives in November 2014 and assumed office in 2015.

Personal life 
Landgraf married Shelby Levins in 2013. They have one daughter.

References

Living people
1981 births
People from Odessa, Texas
Permian High School alumni
Texas A&M University alumni
St. Mary's University School of Law alumni
Texas lawyers
Republican Party members of the Texas House of Representatives
21st-century American politicians